Hatibandha is a census town in Sundargarh district in the Indian state of Odisha.

Demographics
 India census, Hatibandha had a population of 9296. Males constitute 53% of the population and females 47%. Hatibandha has an average literacy rate of 70%, higher than the national average of 59.5%: male literacy is 78%, and female literacy is 61%. In Hatibandha, 12% of the population is under 6 years of age.

References

Cities and towns in Sundergarh district